Dong'an Road is a station on the Shanghai Metro. The station serves lines 4 and 7.

Station Layout

Places nearby
Zhongshan Hospital
Cancer Hospital

References

Shanghai Metro stations in Xuhui District
Line 4, Shanghai Metro
Line 7, Shanghai Metro
Railway stations in China opened in 2005
Railway stations in Shanghai